"Doctorin' the House" is a song by English electronic music duo Coldcut with British singer Yazz, released in February 1988 as the second single from their debut album, What's That Noise? (1989). The track incorporates samples from various sources, mainly TV and film dialogue. It peaked at number six on the UK Singles Chart in March 1988 and spent four weeks in the top 10, making it Coldcut's biggest UK hit single. It also peaked at number one in Zimbabwe and number three on the US Billboard Hot Dance Club Play chart.

Formats and track listings
 7" single
 "Doctorin' the House" — 3:45
 "Doctorin' the House" (theftapella) — 4:03

 12" maxi
 "Doctorin' the House" (vocal) — 5:38
 "Doctorin' the House" (speng) — 6:14

 12" maxi – remixes
 "Doctorin' the House" (the upset remix) — 6:04
 "Doctorin' the House" (acid shut up) (dub) — 6:04 
 "Doctorin' the House" (acid shut up) (trak) — 6:04

Charts

Weekly charts

Year-end charts

References

1988 singles
Coldcut songs
Yazz songs
1988 songs
Virgin Records singles
Number-one singles in Zimbabwe